Ernest Bell was an English footballer who played in the Football League for Notts County.

References

Date of birth unknown
Date of death unknown
English footballers
Notts County F.C. players
English Football League players
Association football forwards